List of islands of Seychelles.

Note

References 

 
Seychelles
Seychelles
Islands